Spörer's law predicts the variation of sunspot latitudes during a solar cycle. It was discovered by the English astronomer Richard Christopher Carrington around 1861. Carrington's work was refined by the German astronomer Gustav Spörer.

At the start of a sunspot cycle, sunspots tend to appear around 30° to 45° latitude on the Sun's surface. As the cycle progresses, sunspots appear at lower and lower latitudes, until they average 15° at solar maximum. The average latitude of sunspots then continues to drift lower, down to about 7° and then while the old sunspot cycle fades, sunspots of the new cycle start appearing at high latitudes.

See also
 Solar variation
 Wolf number
 Joy's law (astronomy)

References

Solar phenomena